Altınbaş University is a foundation university in Istanbul, Turkey. The university was established in 2008 as Istanbul Kemerburgaz University and changed to its current name in 2017. Altınbaş University has more than 5000 international students from 89 countries, approximately 40% of the students are international. The university has 3 campuses located in Istanbul, which are in Bağcılar, Bakırköy and Şişli. Home to 9 undergraduate schools, 3 graduate schools, 2 vocational schools as of the academic year 2019-2020, Altınbaş University is currently offering 30 bachelor’s degree programmes, 34 associate’s degree programmes, 28 master’s degree programmes and 6 PhD programmes.

Accreditations
Officially recognized by the YÖK - Yüksekögretim Kurulu (YÖK - Council of Higher Education), Altinbas Üniversitesi (AU) is a medium-sized ( enrollment range: 8,000-8,999 students) coeducational Turkish higher education institution.

The university is accredited by the European Union and a number of Arab countries such as Iraq, Egypt.

Faculties 

School of Medicine
School of Engineering and Natural Sciences 
School of Dentistry 
School of Pharmacy
School of Economic and Administrative Sciences 
School of Law
School of applied sciences
School of Management
School of Fine Arts and Design

University Gallery

References

External links
http://www.altinbas.edu.tr

Universities and colleges in Istanbul
Educational institutions established in 2008
Private universities and colleges in Turkey
2008 establishments in Turkey
Bağcılar
Bakırköy
Şişli